Roger Federer won in the final 6–4, 6–0 against Andy Roddick.

Seeds

Draw

Finals

Top half

Bottom half

References

Singles
Thailand Open - Singles
 in Thai tennis